Mohammad Ridoy (Bengali: মোহাম্মাদ রিদয়) (born 1 January 2002) is a Bangladeshi footballer who plays as a midfielder for Abahani Limited Dhaka in the Bangladesh Premier League and the Bangladesh national team.

Club career

Early career
Originally from the Narayanganj District of Bangladesh, Ridoy started his football journey at Narayanganj Rainbow Academy under coach Zakir Hossain. He then went onto play for Jurain Football Academy in Pioneer Football League. Ridoy joined Rainbow AC Club in the Dhaka Third Division League, he then went onto play for Purbachal Parishad in Dhaka Second Division and Friends Social Organization in the Dhaka Senior Division League, before finally getting a move to the Bangladesh Premier League by joining Abahani Limited Dhaka, while still being a first year honors second in Accounting at the Fareast International University, in Dhaka.

Abahani Limited Dhaka
During the final matchday game between Bashundhara Kings and Abahani in the 2020–21 Bangladesh Premier League. Ridoy's performance during the game impressed Bangladesh Football Federation president and former national team captain Kazi Salahuddin. After the game Salahuddin personally told the national team coaching staff to include Ridoy in the preliminary squad for the 2021 SAFF Championship.

International career

Youth
Ridoy was part of the Bangladesh U16 team which won the 2015 SAFF U-16 Championship in Sylhet. In the following five years Ridoy took part in the 2016 AFC U-16 Championship qualifiers and the 2020 AFC U-19 Championship qualifiers before making his career breakthrough with Abahani Limited Dhaka in 2021.
 
On 27 October 2021, After being named on the Bangladesh U23 team by coach Maruful Haque for the AFC U-23 Championship 2022 qualifiers, Ridoy made his debut as the Bangladesh U23 team suffered a 1–0 defeat to Kuwait U23. He went on to play the remaining two games, during a disappointing qualification attempt by the Bangladesh U23 team.

Senior
On 22 September 2021, Ridoy was called up to national team by interim coach Óscar Bruzón, 6 hours after the original announcement of the squad for the 2021 SAFF Championship. On 10 November 2021, Ridoy made his debut for the Bangladesh national team against Seychelles during the 2021 Four Nations Football Tournament. He went on to play against both Sri Lanka and Maldives in the same competition.

References 

Living people
2002 births
Footballers from Dhaka
Bangladeshi footballers
Bangladesh international footballers
Association football midfielders